The Osum is a river in southern Albania, one of the source rivers of the Seman. It flows initially south to the Kolonjë municipality, then west to Çepan, and northwest through Çorovodë where it flows through the famous Osum Canyon, Poliçan, Berat and Urë Vajgurore. It joins the Devoll near Kuçovë, to form the Seman. The discharge of the river is reported to vary between /s and /s.

Name 
In classical antiquity, the Osum river was known as the Apsus, which is a derivative of the Indo-European root *ăp- "water, river". The contemporary Albanian name Osum (definite form: Osumi), which is used to indicate the upper course of the river, evolved from *Apsōn(em) through Bulgarian phonetic changes. In Bulgaria there is a river with the same name origin - Osam. Also the contemporary Albanian name Seman/Semen (definite form: Semani/Semeni), which is used to indicate the lower course of the river, evolved from *Apson-, but through Albanian phonetic changes.

See also 

 
 Geography of Albania 
 Rivers of Albania

References 

Rivers of Albania
Geography of Berat County
Geography of Korçë County
Braided rivers in Albania